Vého is a commune in the Meurthe-et-Moselle department in north-eastern France. It is the birthplace of Henri Grégoire (1750–1831), figure of the French Revolution.

See also
Communes of the Meurthe-et-Moselle department

References

Communes of Meurthe-et-Moselle